Jesse Reese, was a black communist and militant trade unionist in the United States.

Early life and career 
After being forced to work in a chain gang, Reese fled from Mississippi to Gary, Indiana in the 1920s. He likely joined the Communist Party shortly after arriving. He lived with Walter Mackerl during the Great Depression. The two of them knew each other from the Universal Negro Improvement Association and Reese was described as "a diehard" by Mackerl.

He got a job at Youngstown Sheet and Tube, which was one of the "little steel" companies, in Indiana Harbor in 1929. According to Reese, a Communist Party organizer came to his home, to ask him to become active in the Amalgamated Association as his assignment. When he was warned that he would be confronted with Jim crow, Reese replied "Well, I have a few other things on my mind. Freedom, Tom Mooney, the Scottsboro boys–nine young Negro boys framed for rape in Scottsboro, Alabama."

Reese was one of the few openly black Communists and served as a spokesman for the party. Reese served as the president of the Youngstown Lake Front Lodge of the Amalgamated Association of Iron, Steel and Tin workers, before he became the first vice president of the newly formed Steel Worker Organizing Committee (SWOC) Local 1011 in 1938.

In the 1930s Reese was named as one of the "six most active" union organizers for the Steel Workers Organizing Committee. In the summer of 1936, SWOC and National Negro Congress held meetings 3 days a week, twice a day, corresponding with the shifts of the workers. George Kimbley, the first black steel worker to join SWOC in Gary, Indiana recounts how he was recruited:

See also 

 Little Steel strike
Communist Party USA and African Americans

Further reading

References

External links 
 1937 Steel strike in Ohio

Members of the Communist Party USA
Year of death missing
Congress of Industrial Organizations people
African-American trade unionists
United Steelworkers people
Year of birth missing
Amalgamated Association of Iron and Steel Workers people